Events in the year 2000 in Greece.

Incumbents

Events 
 8 February  
 The 2000 presidential election is held. The Hellenic Parliament re-elects Konstantinos Stephanopoulos as President of the Hellenic Republic for a second term.
 15 May – Gianna Angelopoulos-Daskalaki becomes the President of the Athens Organizing Committee for the Olympic Games, to became the first woman succeed Panagiotis Thomopoulos.
 October 1 – At the Closing Ceremony, the Olympic Games are handover from Sydney to Athens and returned back to birthplace where the they will host the next Olympic Games in Athens 2004.

References 

 
Years of the 20th century in Greece
Greece
2000s in Greece
Greece